Theophilus Martin "Theo" Nicholls (21 August 1894 – 22 July 1977) was an Australian politician. Born in Wilmington, South Australia, he received a primary education before becoming a wharf labourer. He served in the military from 1915 to 1917 and was secretary of several unions including the Manufacturing Grocers' Employees Federation and the Wool and Basil Workers Federation. He was active in a number of labour movement organisations, such as South Australian Trades and Labour Council, and was vice-president of the South Australian Labor Party. In 1943 he was elected to the Australian Senate as a Labor Senator for South Australia. He served as Chairman of Committees from 1946 to 1949. Nicholls remained in the Senate until his retirement in 1967.

Nicholls died in 1977, aged 84.

His nephew, Martin Nicholls, was a Labor MP for Bonython 1963–1977.

References

Australian Labor Party members of the Parliament of Australia
Members of the Australian Senate for South Australia
Members of the Australian Senate
Australian trade unionists
1894 births
1977 deaths
20th-century Australian politicians